The list of the largest German cities provides an overview of the most populous cities that were located in contemporary German territory at the time of the individual statistics.

Industrialization in the 19th century, especially since the Gründerzeit and the foundation of the German Empire in 1871, brought with it increased urbanization in Germany, leading to a largely urbanized society.

The following tables show historical population figures of German cities according to the respective area status. Also listed is the superordinate administrative unit (state, country, kingdom, province, district) to which the city belonged in the corresponding year. The following historical and current German state entities were taken into account:

 Holy Roman Empire (962–1806)
 German Confederation (1815–1866)
 German Reich (1871–1949)
 German Democratic Republic (1949–1990)
 Federal Republic of Germany (since 1949)

Current information can be found in the list of cities in Germany by population.

Antiquity 

Ancient Rome developed from 200 B.C. and spread from Italy to northern Italy, northern Africa (Tunisia) and central Europe in the following period. The heyday of the ancient Romans can be seen in the 1st to 3rd century A.D., many ancient ruins date from this period.

Roman cities in Germany were mainly built along the Rhine and Danube:

 Augsburg
 Bonn
 Koblenz
 Cologne
 Mainz
 Neuss
 Nida
 Passau
 Regensburg
 Straubing
 Trier, already in the 3rd and 4th century the largest city north of the Alps with an estimated 80,000 inhabitants
 Xanten

Middle Ages to modern times 
With the migration of peoples in the 5th century, the ancient cities on the territory of present-day Germany were largely decayed. Only Augsburg, Regensburg, Trier and Cologne have been preserved as cities. The number of cities in Central Europe remained very small until about 1100 with a few hundred. By far the largest number of new cities was created in the following 250 years, when numerous cities were founded from 1120 onwards, mostly by an act of foundation and town planning. Around the beginning of the modern era, at the beginning of the 16th century, the free and imperial cities as well as the residence cities were the most important cities (among others, today mainly Dutch, French and Belgian cities):

 Cologne and Prague with about 40,000 inhabitants,
 Augsburg, Lübeck, Magdeburg and Nuremberg with about 20,000 to 30,000 inhabitants,
 Aachen, Basel, Braunschweig, Bremen, Breslau, Erfurt, Geneva, Hamburg, Lüneburg, Metz, Trier, Ulm and Vienna, with about 10,000–20,000 inhabitants.

1500 
The population figures are estimates.

1700 

The population figures are estimates.

1750 
The population figures are estimates.

1800 
The population figures are estimates.

1849 

The population and area status refer to the census of 3 December 1849.

1880 

The population and area status refer to the census of 1 December 1880.

1910 

The population and area status refer to the census of 1 December 1910.

1919 

The population and area status refer to the census of 8 October 1919.

1939 

The population and area status refer to the census of 17 May 1939.

1946 

The population and area status refer to the census of 29 October 1946.

1975 
The population figures for the year 1975 are estimates.

1: East Berlin (1,098,174) and West Berlin (1,984,837)

2000 

The population figures for the year 2000 are estimates.

2015 

The population figures for the year 2015 are estimates.

References 

 Eberhard Isenmann: Die deutsche Stadt im Spätmittelalter, 1250–1500: Stadtgestalt, Recht, Stadtregiment, Kirche, Gesellschaft, Wirtschaft. Verlag Eugen Ulmer, Stuttgart 1988, .
 Heinz Schilling: Die Stadt in der frühen Neuzeit. Enzyklopädie deutscher Geschichte. Band 24, Oldenbourg Wissenschaftsverlag, München 2004, .
 Wolfgang R. Krabbe: Die deutsche Stadt im 19. und 20. Jahrhundert: eine Einführung. Vandenhoeck & Ruprecht, Göttingen 1989, .
 Otto Hübner: Jahrbuch für Volkswirtschaft und Statistik, Verlag von Heinrich Hübner, Leipzig 1854
 Kaiserliches Statistisches Amt (Hrsg.): Statistisches Jahrbuch für das Deutsche Reich, 1880–1918
 Statistisches Reichsamt (Hrsg.): Statistisches Jahrbuch für das Deutsche Reich, 1919–1941/42
 Deutscher Städtetag (Hrsg.): Statistisches Jahrbuch Deutscher Gemeinden, 1890 ff.
 Statistisches Bundesamt (Hrsg.): Statistisches Jahrbuch für die Bundesrepublik Deutschland, 1952 ff.
 Staatliche Zentralverwaltung für Statistik (Hrsg.): Statistisches Jahrbuch der Deutschen Demokratischen Republik, 1955–1989

Cities
historical population
Economic history of Germany
Germany history-related lists
Cities

Germany